Yeniçağlar is a village in the Kozluk District of Batman Province in Turkey. The village is populated by Kurds of the Bekiran tribe and had a population of 1,606 in 2021.

The hamlet of Bacak is attached to the village.

References 

Villages in Kozluk District
Kurdish settlements in Batman Province